PIDD may refer to:

 p53-induced protein with a death domain, also known as LRDD,
 Primary Immune Deficiency Disease